Ebersmunster is a commune in the Bas-Rhin department in Alsace in north-eastern France.

It is famous for its 1727 baroque church, a work by Vorarlberg architect Peter Thumb.

Population

See also
Communes of the Bas-Rhin department

References

Communes of Bas-Rhin
Bas-Rhin communes articles needing translation from French Wikipedia